Jalgaon is a census town in Ratnagiri district in the Indian state of Maharashtra.

History
Jalgaon is a native settlement of the Barves, or people of the Barve surname. Each year, during the Hindu Festival of Rama Navami, several hundreds of people gather here (especially Barve's)

Geography
It has an average elevation of 184 metres (603 feet).

Demographics
 India census, Jalgaon had a population of 5448. Males constitute 51% of the population and females 49%. Jalgaon has an average literacy rate of 80%, higher than the national average of 59.5%: male literacy is 85%, and female literacy is 74%. In Jalgaon, 11% of the population is under 6 years of age. Most of the people in Jalgaon belong to the Chitpavan community. There are about 0.2% people belonging to the Scheduled Castes and Scheduled Tribes.

References

Cities and towns in Ratnagiri district